The Nationalist Democratic Movement (NDM) is a political party in Bangladesh. It was officially launched on 23 April 2017 with the sole purpose of returning the power of government to the hands of the citizenry.
It is a broad based party that practices inclusive politics and champions democracy and citizen's rights, and the nation's inherent national values. Its ideology is defined by its leaders as one based on their definition of Bangladeshi Nationalism. It identifies as centrist.
The party has got registration from the Election Commission of Bangladesh. The symbol of the party is Lion.

History
Nationalist Democratic Movement – NDM has its origins in the ShopnerDesh movement started by party founder and Chairman, Bobby Hajjaj. The erosion of political values, centralization of party power, and the abeyance of democratic norms, were reasons stated by party leaders for their formation of the party.
Party Chairman along with other current members of the NDM's National Executive Committee started work on launching the party at a national scale in midyear 2016  and on 23 April 2017 they officially launched the party.
According to party leadership NDM had the biggest launch of any political party in Bangladesh with representatives from over thirty districts convening for the official launch in Dhaka.

Ideology
In its official Declaration NDM lists (i) Bangladeshi Nationalism, (ii) Religious Values, (iii) Spirit of Independence, and (iv) Accountable Democracy, as their core values.
The first, Bangladeshi Nationalism, is made declared as most significant and they argue that their definition differs from the current understanding of the term in Bangladesh politics.

Bangladeshi Nationalism
The party's Declaration denounces the use of the term by other political parties, especially the BNP, and adds that theirs is a definition of complete national inclusion. They also aver that the Awami League's  ideology of Bengali Nationalism is outdated, stating that the citizenry is now unified under their identity as Bangladeshi and not through language, religion, or any other cultural artifact.

Their declaration document states
Bangladeshi Nationalism cannot and must not ever be confused with jingoism or a philosophy of exclusion. It is an overarching philosophy of belonging, an establishment of faith in the bonds of citizenship, in the fraternity and love of each other and of nation that transcends all other constructs. Bangladeshi Nationalism is the inherent faith we have in our identity and is the bedrock of NDM.

Elections
The party was seeking registration from the Election Commission of Bangladesh to participate in the next General Election, likely to be held in late 2018 or early 2019. The party has got registration from the Election Commission of Bangladesh on 29 January 2019. The symbol of the party is Lion.

References

External links
  Nationalist Democratic Movement's (Bangladesh) official website

Political parties in Bangladesh
2017 establishments in Bangladesh